Substitute natural gas (SNG), or synthetic natural gas, is a fuel gas (predominantly methane, CH4) that can be produced from fossil fuels such as lignite coal, oil shale, or from biofuels (when it is named bio-SNG) or using electricity with power-to-gas systems.

SNG in the form of LNG or CNG can be used in road, rail, air and marine transport vehicles as a substitute for costly diesel, petrol, etc. The carbon footprint of SNG derived from coal is comparable to petroleum products. Bio-SNG has a much smaller carbon footprint when compared to petroleum products. LPG can also be produced by synthesising SNG  with partial reverse hydrogenation at high pressure and low temperature. LPG is more easily transportable than SNG, more suitable as fuel in two wheeler or smaller HP vehicles /engines and also fetches higher price in international market due to short supply.

 + 4H2 → CH4 + 2H2O

Distribution 
It is advantageous to distribute SNG and bio-SNG together with natural gas in a gas grid. In this way, the production of renewable gas can be phased in at the same rate as the production capacity is increased. The gas market and infrastructure the natural gas has contributed with is a condition for large scale introduction of renewable biomethane produced through anaerobic digestion (biogas) or gasification and methanation bio-SNG.

Projects 

The Great Plains Synfuels Plant injects approximately 4.1 million m3/day of SNG from lignite coal into the United States national gas grid. The production process of SNG at the Great Plains plant involves gasification, gas cleaning, shift, and methanation. China is constructing nearly 30 nos massive SNG production plants from coal / lignite with aggregate annual capacity of 120 billion standard cubic meters of SNG.

See also
 Landfill gas
 Renewable natural gas
 Oil shale gas
 Power to gas

References

External links
 SGC Rapport 187 Substitute natural gas from biomass gasification
 SGC-rapport on gasification and methanation

Natural gas
Synthetic fuel technologies